Bomba and the Jungle Girl is a 1952 American adventure film directed by Ford Beebe and starring Johnny Sheffield. It is the eighth film (of 12) in the Bomba, the Jungle Boy film series.

Plot
Bomba decides to find out who his parents were. He starts with Cody Casson's diary and follows the trail to a native village. An ancient blind woman tells him his parents, along the village's true ruler, were murdered by the current chieftain and his daughter. With the aid of an inspector and his daughter, Bomba battles the usurpers in the cave where his parents were buried.

Cast
 Johnny Sheffield as Bomba
 Karen Sharpe as Linda Ward
 Walter Sande as Mr. Ward
 Suzette Harbin as Boru
 Martin Wilkins as Chief Gamboso
 Morris Buchanan as Kokoli
 Leonard Mudie as Commissioner Barnes
 Don Blackman as Boru's lieutenant

References

External links

1952 films
American adventure films
Films directed by Ford Beebe
Films produced by Walter Mirisch
Monogram Pictures films
1952 adventure films
American black-and-white films
1950s English-language films
1950s American films